Malice Aforethought is a 1979 BBC TV adaptation of the novel of the same name. It is a four-part serial It later aired in 1981 when it was featured in the US PBS series, Mystery!, introduced by Vincent Price.
It was praised as a faithful adaptation, which retained the atmosphere and 1920s setting of the book. Cheryl Campbell was nominated for a BAFTA Award for Best Actress for her role as Madeleine Cranmere, along with her performance in Testament of Youth, winning for the latter at the 1980 Baftas.

There was a later adaptation of the novel by ITV Granada in 2005, starring Ben Miller and Megan Dodds. This version has been released on DVD, but the 1979 adaptation has never received either a video or DVD release, and has not been repeated on TV since 1981.

Plot summary 
The central character is a Devon physician, Dr. Bickleigh, who is in an unhappy marriage to a domineering wife, Julia.  Initially he has some hopes of divorcing Julia and marrying a younger woman, Madeleine, who he is flirting with.  However his hopes of divorce fade, and he uses his medical knowledge to murder Julia, to marry Madeleine.  His method is a devious and some would say unusually cruel one: he slowly feeds her a chemical which gives her blinding headaches, which leads to her taking opium painkillers, so that she apparently dies of an accidental overdose of opium.  He appears to get away with it, but one person who suspects the truth is Madeleine, who marries another man, and some people in the local community wrongly suspect that Julia committed suicide because of problems in their marriage.  As Dr. Bickleigh realizes that Madeleine suspects what happened he attempts to poison her and her new husband, they survive, but this leads the authorities to become suspicious about the death of Julia some time earlier.  Her body is exhumed and Dr. Bickleigh is put on trial for her murder.

Cast
Hywel Bennett as Dr. Bickleigh
Cheryl Campbell as Madeleine Cranmere
Judy Parfitt as Julia Bickleigh
Belinda Carroll as Ivy Ridgeway
Christopher Guard as Denny Bourne
David Ashford as William Chatford
Harold Innocent as Rev. Hessary Torr
Elizabeth Stewart as Mrs Torr
Briony McRoberts as Quarnian Torr
Susan Porrett as Florence, the Bickleigh's maid
Vivienne Moore as Madeleine Cranmere's maid
John Woodnutt as Dr Lydston
James Grout as Chief Inspector Russell
Antony Brown as Superintendent Allhayes
Rohan McCullough as Gwynyfryd Rattery
Shirley Cain as Miss Peavy
Mary Laine as Miss Wapsworthy
Anthony Woodruff as Mr Gunhill
Thorley Waters as Sir Francis Lee-Bannerton
Michael Aldridge as Sir Bernard Deverell
Doreen Mantle as Hilda
Michael Lees as Victor

References

External links

BBC television dramas
1979 in British television
Television shows based on British novels